A Formosa bond is a bond issued in Taiwan but denominated in a currency other than the New Taiwan Dollar.  They are issued by the Taiwan branches of publicly traded overseas financial institutions and to be traded must have a credit rating of BBB or higher.

History
The major designer and promoter of the Formosa bond was Lee Shyan-yuan, a board member of Taiwan's market regulator, the Financial Supervisory Commission (FSC). 

The name refers to Formosa, an alternative name for the island of Taiwan; it was chosen as the result of a contest held in September 2006 by the FSC. 15 names were suggested, intended to reflect special characteristics of Taiwan; two different Chinese-language versions of the name "Formosa bond" were suggested, as well as "C-Wang Bond" and "High-Tech Island Bond". Participants were also invited to suggest their own names for the bonds. The result of the contest was announced on 25 September 2006; "Formosa Bond" was the most popular choice, with 5,776 votes, or 57.16% of the total cast; the second-most popular choice, Taiwan 101 Bond, had only 1,229 votes, and the third-most popular choice, an alternative Chinese translation of "Formosa Bond", garnered only 618 votes.

Trading
Bonds to be traded must have a credit rating of BBB or higher. Trading between securities firms has to be carried out through a subsystem of the GreTai Securities Market's Electronic Bond Trading System, for which trading hours are between 9:00 AM and 1:30 PM.  However, Formosa bonds also listed on overseas exchanges may be traded over-the-counter between bond dealers.

The first Formosa bonds were part of a US$250 million carried out by Deutsche Bank in November 2006; BNP Paribas followed with an Australian dollar issuance, initially planned at A$500 million (US$386 million at then-current exchange rates) for February 2007, but later reduced to A$308 million (US$258 million) and delayed until 10 April 2007. HSBC were also said to be considering issuing such a bond, and BNP Paribas suggested that they might regularly issue Formosa Bonds. 

Presently, only Taiwan branches of publicly traded overseas financial institutions are permitted to issue Formosa Bonds; the market regulator has floated the idea of extending this permission to other branches and subsidiaries of such institutions as well.

See also
 Foreign currency denominated bond
 Eurobond

References

Bonds in foreign currencies
Economic history of Taiwan
Finance in Taiwan